Wilson Security is an Australian private security company. In 2014 it acquired the security contracts of ISS A/S Security in Australia and First Security Business in New Zealand. Wilson Security is a part of the Wilson Group which is Hong Kong owned. 

In 2015 it was a subcontractor of Broadspectrum at Australian offshore detention facilities (the others being managed by Serco at the time). At the time, Wilson had been working on Nauru since late 2012, and on Manus Island since February 2014.

Controversies
In August 2015, two former Wilson Security guards spoke out against the company in an interview for the Australian Broadcasting Corporation's The 7.30 Report. They, among others, accused Wilson Security and Broadspectrum/Transfield of providing misleading information to the Australian Parliament, and covering up malpractice at the Nauru Centre. They also claimed that a spying operation against Senator Sarah Hanson-Young which was first revealed in June 2015, was more extensive than Wilson Security or Broadspectrum/Transfield had admitted.

In March 2017, two Australian employees of Wilson Security were deported to Australia by the Government of Nauru, for unspecified reasons.

In February 2018, the National Gallery of Victoria dropped its contract with Wilson Security due to protests by artists over Wilson Security's role on Manus and Nauru.

References

External links

Nam Viet IT Website
USPA Nationwide Security

Companies based in Melbourne
Australian companies established in 2014
Security companies of Australia
Service companies of Australia